Roddie MacDonald (born 30 August 1954 in Alness) is a Scottish former footballer. MacDonald started his senior career with Brora Rangers, in the Highland Football League. He then played in the Scottish Football League signing for Celtic in 1972 breaking through title winning 73/74 season. MacDonald remained at Celtic throughout 70's winning 2 further league titles and contributing 80/81 before leaving for Heart of Midlothian F.C.Added to that 3 Scottish cups and 1 League Cup. Morton, Partick Thistle and Queen of the South.

he later became a police officer.

References

External links 
Roddy MacDonald, London Hearts Supporters' Club

1954 births
Living people
People from Ross and Cromarty
Sportspeople from Highland (council area)
Association football central defenders
Scottish footballers
Brora Rangers F.C. players
Highland Football League players
Celtic F.C. players
Heart of Midlothian F.C. players
Greenock Morton F.C. players
Partick Thistle F.C. players
Queen of the South F.C. players
Irvine Meadow XI F.C. players
Vale of Leven F.C. players
Scottish Junior Football Association players
Scottish Football League players
Scotland under-23 international footballers